Merrick Road is an east–west urban arterial in Queens, Nassau, and Suffolk counties in New York, United States. It is known as Merrick Boulevard or Floyd H. Flake Boulevard in Queens, within New York City.

Merrick Road runs east from the Queens neighborhood of Jamaica through Merrick past the county line between Nassau and Suffolk into Amityville, where it becomes Montauk Highway at the Amityville–Copiague village/hamlet line. The easternmost portion of Merrick Road, from Carman Mill Road to its eastern terminus, signed as part of New York State Route 27A (NY 27A). At one time, the entire length of Merrick Road was signed as NY 27A; currently, the entire portion within Nassau County is currently designated as the unsigned County Route 27 (CR 27). Merrick Road travels along an old right-of-way that was one of the original paths across southern Long Island, stretching from Queens to Montauk Point. 

Merrick Road's name comes from the Algonquin word "Meroke", meaning "oyster bed". The section of Merrick Boulevard in Queens was renamed Floyd H. Flake Boulevard in October 2020, in honor of Floyd Flake, senior pastor of the Greater Allen A. M. E. Cathedral of New York in Jamaica.

Route description
Merrick Boulevard, also known as Floyd H. Flake Boulevard, begins at NY 25 (Hillside Avenue) as a two-lane, one-way street heading eastbound (compass south at this point), which continues north of Hillside Avenue as 166th Street. Two blocks to the south of Hillside Avenue, Merric Boulevard passes by the Central Branch of the Queens Library and the 165th Street Bus Terminal. A block to its east, 168th Street provides for westbound traffic. Just south of Liberty Avenue, the two directions join together to form a four-lane, divided Merrick Boulevard. Among the parks that the road passes are Proctor-Hopson Circle, St. Albans Park, and Roy Wilkins Park. Merrick Boulevard gradually turns southeast and east, passing through Springfield Gardens, Laurelton and crossing the Belt Parkway before leaving Queens into Nassau County, where it becomes Merrick Road. The section of Merrick Boulevard in Queens was renamed Floyd H. Flake Boulevard in October 2020, in honor of Floyd Flake, senior pastor of the Greater Allen A. M. E. Cathedral of New York in Jamaica.

Merrick Road is one of the old roads along the southern side of Long Island; it has since been replaced by Sunrise Highway (NY 27) for most through traffic. At Rockville Centre, bridges take it over NY 27, with four directional ramps forming a partial interchange. Farther east, it serves as the southern end for state roads such as NY 107, NY 110, and the Seaford–Oyster Bay Expressway (NY 135).

NY 27A begins as a split from NY 27 in East Massapequa, where NY 27 leaves the original Sunrise Gold Circle, which is now Old Sunrise Highway (unsigned NY 900D) east of the split. NY 27A quickly turns south off Old Sunrise Highway onto Carman Mill Road, which ends at Merrick Road. Merrick Road from that point east continues through Massapequa over the Nassau/Suffolk border into Amityville, Suffolk County, where it becomes Montauk Highway at the Amityville/Copiague village/hamlet line. Amityville is the only town in Suffolk County where southernmost major road is known as Merrick Road (it is known as Montauk Highway in every other settlement along the South Shore of Suffolk County.

Both the Meadowbrook State Parkway and the Wantagh State Parkway have interchanges with Merrick Road. A truck needing to make a delivery to the barrier beaches along Ocean Parkway may enter either parkway southbound at this road and at no point farther north.

Transportation

The Q5 is the main option for public transportation in Queens, running on Merrick Boulevard between Archer Avenue and Hook Creek Boulevard. The Q84 and the Q85 both serve Merrick Boulevard between Archer Avenue and Baisley Boulevard. The Q4 serves it between Archer Avenue and Linden Boulevard.

The n4/n4x is the main mode of public transportation on Merrick Road in Nassau County, serving it between 165th Street Bus Terminal and Freeport LIRR, running closed door service in Queens, with the n19 serving Merrick Road between Freeport LIRR and Unqua Road.The 165th Street Bus Terminal is located on Merrick Boulevard and 89th Avenue, serving multiple MTA bus routes and 4 Nassau Inter-County Express bus routes.

Major intersections

See also

List of county routes in Nassau County, New York
Proctor-Hopson Circle

References

External links

Streets in Queens, New York
Transportation in Nassau County, New York